Samoylovsky (masculine), Samoylovskaya (feminine), or Samoylovskoye (neuter) may refer to:
Samoylovsky District, a district of Saratov Oblast, Russia
Samoylovsky (rural locality) (Samoylovskaya, Samoylovskoye), several rural localities in Russia
Samoylovsky Island, an island housing a Russian Arctic research station